Part of the AFI 100 Years… series, AFI's 100 Years…100 Thrills is a list of the top 100 most exciting movies in American cinema. The list was unveiled by the American Film Institute on June 12, 2001, during a CBS special hosted by Harrison Ford.

Nine Alfred Hitchcock films made to the list, making him the most represented director.

List of films

Criteria
Feature-Length Fiction Film: The film must be in narrative format, typically more than 60 minutes long.
American Film: The film must be in the English language with significant creative and/or financial production elements from the United States.
Thrills: Regardless of genre, the total adrenaline-inducing impact of a film’s artistry and craft must create an experience that engages our bodies as well as our minds.
Legacy: Films whose "thrills" have enlivened and enriched America’s film heritage while continuing to inspire contemporary artists and audiences.

External links
American Film Institute's 100 Years, 100 Thrills (winners)
List of the 400 nominated thrillers.

AFI 100 Years... series
Thriller films
Centennial anniversaries